Thubron is an English family name.

 Ernest Blakelock Thubron (1861–1927), raced in 1908 Olympics as Emile Thubron
 Gerald Thubron OBE (1903–1992) his son, British soldier
 Colin Thubron (born 1939) his grandson, British writer 
 Harry Thubron (1915–1985) English artist and art teacher
 Brigadier Gerald Ernest Thubron, son of Ernest Blakelock Thubron

English-language surnames